Teri Tordai (born 28 December 1941) is a Hungarian actress.

She has appeared in a large number of European films, including a number of costume films made in the late 1960s and early 1970s, especially Frau Wirtin series of Franz Antel, which made her a sex symbol in German-speaking countries as well as Italy.

She is sometimes credited as Terry Torday.

Her daughter is the actress Lili Horváth.

Selected filmography
 Háry János (1965)
 A Holiday with Piroschka (1965)
 The Sweet Sins of Sexy Susan (1967)
 Otto ist auf Frauen scharf (1968)
  (1968)
 Sexy Susan Sins Again (1968)
 House of Pleasure (1969)
 Why Did I Ever Say Yes Twice? (1969)
  (1969)
 The Captain (1971)
 My Father, the Ape and I (1971)
 The Countess Died of Laughter (1973)
 The Pendragon Legend (1974)
 Julia (1974)
 Monika and the Sixteen Year Olds (1975)
 Crime After School (1975)
 Love Hotel in Tyrol (1978)
  (1983)
 Colonel Redl (1985)
 The Red Countess (1985)
 Hanna's War (1988)
 Montecarlo! (2004)
 Adventure (2011)

Bibliography
 Halle, Randall & McCarthy, Margaret. Light Motives: German Popular Film in Perspective. Wayne State University Press, 2003.

External links

1941 births
Living people
Hungarian film actresses
People from Debrecen